Chand Ke Paar Chalo may refer to:

 Chand Ke Paar Chalo (film), a 2006 Indian Bollywood film directed by Mustafa Engineer 
 Chand Ke Paar Chalo (TV series), a daily soap that airs on NDTV Imagine